"38 Years Old" is a song by Canadian rock band The Tragically Hip. It was released in April 1990 as the fourth single from the band's first full-length studio album, Up to Here.  The song peaked at No. 41 on the Canadian RPM singles chart.

Content
The song is a fictional account of the real-life escape of 14 inmates from Millhaven Institution near the band's hometown of Kingston, Ontario, on July 10, 1972. The date of the event and the number of escapees mentioned in the song are historically incorrect ("12 men broke loose in '73..."). 

Lyrically, the song is written from the perspective of the younger brother of one of the escapees, a man who murdered the man who raped their sister.

Background
The song was written in Memphis during their recording of the album.

Though it is one of The Tragically Hip's most popular songs, the band seldom played the song live. In Michael Barclay's 2018 book The Never-Ending Present: The Story of Gord Downie and the Tragically Hip, the band's reticence to play the song live is attributed to a misperception among some of the band's fans that the song was autobiographical: because its emotional climax hinges on the moment when the narrator opens the window for "my older brother Mike", some fans have erroneously assumed that Gord Downie's real brother, documentary filmmaker Mike Downie, was himself a prisoner and one of the escapees from Millhaven.

Charts

References

1989 songs
1990 singles
The Tragically Hip songs
MCA Records singles
Songs based on Canadian history
Songs about prison
Fiction about prison escapes
Ontario in fiction
Fiction set in 1973
Songs written by Rob Baker (guitarist)
Songs written by Gord Downie